Charles Wayne Toogood (July 16, 1927February 22, 1997) was a professional American football defensive lineman in the National Football League. After playing college football at Nebraska, Toogood was drafted by the Los Angeles Rams in the 3rd round (35th overall) of the 1951 NFL Draft. He played seven seasons for the Rams (1951–1956) and the Chicago Cardinals (1957).

References

1927 births
1997 deaths
People from North Platte, Nebraska
Players of American football from Nebraska
American football defensive tackles
Nebraska Cornhuskers football players
Los Angeles Rams players
Chicago Cardinals players